Island in the Sea of Time (ISOT) is the first of the three alternate history novels of the Nantucket series by S. M. Stirling. It was released in the United States and Canada on February 1, 1998 and in the United Kingdom a month later on March 1 the same year.

Plot summary
At 9:15 pm EST on March 17, 1998, a circular region, including the island of Nantucket and the United States Coast Guard cutter Eagle sailing nearby, are transported by an unknown phenomenon (called "The Event") back in time to the Bronze Age circa 1250s B.C. (corresponding to the late Heroic Age of the Trojan War).

As the truth of what has happened sinks in, panic grips the island. Chief of Police Jared Cofflin is given emergency powers and begins organizing the people to help produce food for the island so they can feed themselves. Meanwhile, Captain Marian Alston takes the Eagle to Britain, with Classics historian Ian Arnstein and astronomer (and Lithuanian-speaking) Doreen Rosenthal as interpreters, where they trade Nantucket-made goods with the Iraiina for grain. (The Lithuanian language is very conservative among European languages and even in its modern version possesses identifiable links to proto-Indo-European.) The Iraiina, whose name translates as "noble ones", are a "Sun People" tribe that has been steadily invading Britain. As a gift, the Iraiina chief gives Marian a slave, Swindapa, a captured female "Earth People" warrior. Swindapa is freed and decides to stay with Marian. The Eagle leaves for Nantucket, but takes with them Isketerol, a wily Tartessian merchant who hopes to learn from the Americans. Ian Arnstein and Isketerol are able to communicate because both can speak versions of ancient Greek.

While the people of Nantucket work for their survival, the ambitious and ruthless Lieutenant William Walker of the Eagle decides that with modern technology he could become a king. With the help of Isketerol and others, Walker convinces some naive environmentalists to steal a ship and kidnap Cofflin's wife, so they can give the benefits of modern culture to Native Americans. Meanwhile, Walker and Isketerol steal another ship and return to Britain to recruit soldiers for their eventual takeover of Greece. Marian decides to rescue Cofflin's wife and saves her after defeating an Olmec army. The bloodthirsty Olmecs proceed to gruesomely kill the modern Americans who sought to help them.

Walker solidifies his control over the Sun People, while Nantucket creates a new government and prepares to take down Walker. Marian returns to Britain with a small army and uses Swindapa, who has become her lover, to convince the Earth People to fight with them to defeat Walker. Both sides meet at the Battle of the Downs. Though Nantucket and its allies are victorious, Walker manages to escape with his followers to Greece.

Characters

See also

Dies the Fire – "The Event" that sends Nantucket back in time also changes the law of physics in the Emberverse series

References

Sources

External links
Sample Chapters

Nantucket series
1998 Canadian novels
1998 science fiction novels
Canadian alternative history novels
Novels about time travel
Novels by S. M. Stirling
Novels set in Massachusetts
Roc Books books